Mingon is the name of several villages in Burma:

Mingon (24°42"N 95°40"E), Banmauk Township
Mingon (24°'11"N 95°53"E), Banmauk Township